Brigadier General Clement Leslie Smith,  (17 January 1878 – 14 December 1927) was a British Army officer and a recipient of the Victoria Cross, the highest award for gallantry in the face of the enemy that can be awarded to British and Commonwealth forces.

Military career
Smith was commissioned into the Duke of Cornwall's Light Infantry as a second lieutenant on 5 May 1900, and the following year served in South Africa as a Railway Staff officer during the Second Boer War. After the end of the war (in June 1902), he was promoted to lieutenant on 9 August 1902, and left South Africa for England on the SS Simla in October that year.

Details on Victoria Cross
Smith was 25 years old, serving in the 2nd Battalion, Duke of Cornwall's Light Infantry, attached to the 5th Somaliland Light Infantry during the Fourth Somaliland Expedition when the following deed took place for which he was awarded the VC.

On 10 January 1904 at the commencement of the fight at Jidballi, British Somaliland, Lieutenant Smith and a medical officer tried to rescue a hospital assistant who was wounded. The rapidity of the enemy's fire, however, made this impossible and the hospital assistant was killed. Lieutenant Smith then did all that was possible to bring out the medical officer, helping him to mount a horse and, when this was shot, a mule. This animal also was shot and the medical officer was killed, but the lieutenant stayed with him to the end, trying to keep off the enemy with his revolver.

Later career
Smith later advanced to the rank of brigadier general. During the First World War he commanded the Imperial Camel Corps Brigade based in Egypt.

The medal
His Victoria Cross is displayed at the Duke of Cornwall's Light Infantry Museum in Bodmin, Cornwall, England.

References

External links

1878 births
1927 deaths
British recipients of the Victoria Cross
Recipients of the Military Cross
Duke of Cornwall's Light Infantry officers
British colonial army officers
British military personnel of the Fourth Somaliland Expedition
People from Cowes
British Army generals of World War I
British Army personnel of the Second Boer War
British Army recipients of the Victoria Cross
Military personnel from Hampshire